Ron Brooks (born October 16, 1988) is a former American football cornerback. He was drafted by the Buffalo Bills in fourth round of the 2012 NFL Draft. He played college football at LSU. He has also played for the Philadelphia Eagles and San Diego Fleet.

Early life
A native of Irving, Texas, Brooks attended MacArthur High School, where he was a decorated dual-threat quarterback. As a senior, he rushed for 1,264 yards and 19 touchdowns, and also threw for 882 yards and nine touchdowns while being named the District 7-5A MVP. He was selected to the 2007 U.S. Army All-American Bowl in San Antonio, Texas.

Brooks was a four-star recruit as an athlete coming out of high school by Rivals.com. He chose LSU over offers from Arkansas, Texas Tech, and Texas A&M.

College career
Appearing in 53 games, he accumulated 90 tackles, including 12.5 for loss, 5.5 sacks, ten pass breakups, three interceptions, and forced five fumbles while recovering three. He started in three games in his career at LSU, playing behind Patrick Peterson, Morris Claiborne, and Tyrann Mathieu.

Professional career

Buffalo Bills
Brooks was selected by the Buffalo Bills in the fourth round, 124th overall, of the 2012 NFL Draft. The Bills previously traded Lee Evans to the Baltimore Ravens to acquire the pick used to select Brooks.

2012 season 
In his rookie season, he missed the first seven games due to a broken bone in his foot he sustained in the final pre-season game against the Detroit Lions. He was placed on injured reserve with the "designated to return" label. He returned in Week 9 against the Houston Texans, and went on to play in nine games, starting in two of them, and finished his rookie season with 19 tackles and four passes defended.

On December 2, 2012, Brooks made his first career NFL start and led the Bills with a season high nine tackles and three passes defensed against the Jacksonville Jaguars.

2013 season 
Brooks spent his 2013 season mostly on special teams, recording only 7 tackles on the season.

2014 season 
On December 2, 2014, making his only start of the season, Brooks led the Bills with a season high eight tackles and a pass defended against the New England Patriots.

2015 season 
On December 30, 2015, Brooks was placed on injured reserve.

Philadelphia Eagles

2016 season
On March 9, 2016, Brooks signed a three-year deal with the Philadelphia Eagles, reuniting him with former Bills defensive coordinator Jim Schwartz. In Week 7 against the Minnesota Vikings, Brooks ruptured his right quadriceps tendon, keeping him out for the rest of the season.

On August 30, 2017, Brooks was released by the Eagles.

San Diego Fleet
In 2019, Brooks joined the San Diego Fleet of the Alliance of American Football. In the season opener against the San Antonio Commanders, Brooks intercepted quarterback Logan Woodside in the endzone. In 8 games prior to the league suspending operations, Brooks also made 13 tackles, and defended 5 passes, while also contributing as a returner on special teams, including a 56 yard punt return for a touchdown in week 4. The league ceased operations in April 2019.

References

External links
LSU Tigers bio
Buffalo Bills bio

Living people
1988 births
Players of American football from Dallas
African-American players of American football
American football cornerbacks
LSU Tigers football players
Buffalo Bills players
Philadelphia Eagles players
San Diego Fleet players
21st-century African-American sportspeople
20th-century African-American people